Dorcadion lineatopunctatum is a species of beetle in the family Cerambycidae. It was described by Stephan von Breuning in 1944.

References

lineatopunctatum
Beetles described in 1944